Lemuridae is a family of strepsirrhine primates native to Madagascar and the Comoros. They are represented by the Lemuriformes in Madagascar with one of the highest concentration of the lemurs. One of five families commonly known as lemurs. These animals were once thought to be the evolutionary predecessors of monkeys and apes, but this is no longer considered correct. They are formally referred to as lemurids.

Classification

The family Lemuridae contains 21 extant species in five genera.

Family Lemuridae
Genus Lemur
Ring-tailed lemur, Lemur catta
Genus Eulemur, true lemursCommon brown lemur, Eulemur fulvusSanford's brown lemur, Eulemur sanfordiWhite-headed lemur, Eulemur albifronsRed lemur, Eulemur rufusRed-fronted lemur, Eulemur rufifronsCollared brown lemur, Eulemur collarisGray-headed lemur, Eulemur cinereicepsBlack lemur, Eulemur macacoBlue-eyed black lemur, Eulemur flavifronsCrowned lemur, Eulemur coronatusRed-bellied lemur, Eulemur rubriventerMongoose lemur, Eulemur mongozGenus Varecia, ruffed lemurs
Black-and-white ruffed lemur, Varecia variegataRed ruffed lemur, Varecia rubraGenus Hapalemur, bamboo lemurs
Eastern lesser bamboo lemur (a.k.a. gray gentle bamboo lemur), Hapalemur griseusSouthern lesser bamboo lemur, Hapalemur meridionalisWestern lesser bamboo lemur, Hapalemur occidentalisLac Alaotra gentle lemur (a.k.a. bandro), Hapalemur alaotrensisGolden bamboo lemur, Hapalemur aureusGreater bamboo lemur, Hapalemur simusGenus †Pachylemur†Pachylemur insignis†Pachylemur jullyiThis family was once broken into two subfamilies, Hapalemurinae (bamboo lemurs and the greater bamboo lemur) and Lemurinae (the rest of the family), but molecular evidence and the similarity of the scent glands have since placed the ring-tailed lemur with the bamboo lemurs and the greater bamboo lemur.

Lemur species in the genus Eulemur'' are known to interbreed, despite having dramatically different chromosome numbers. Red-fronted (2N=60) and collared (2N=50–52) brown lemurs were found to hybridize at Berenty Reserve, Madagascar.

Characteristics 

Lemurids are medium-sized arboreal primates, ranging from 32 to 56 cm in length, excluding the tail, and weighing from 0.7 to 5 kg. They have long, bushy tails and soft, woolly fur of varying coloration. The hindlegs are slightly longer than the forelegs, although not enough to hamper fully quadrupedal movement (unlike the sportive lemurs). Most species are highly agile, and regularly leap several metres between trees. They have a good sense of smell and binocular vision. Unlike most other lemurs, all but one species of lemurid (the ring-tailed lemur) lack a tapetum lucidum, a reflective layer in the eye that improves night vision. Historically among mammals, activity cycles are either strictly diurnal or nocturnal, however, these can widely vary across species. Lemur activity has in general evolved from nocturnal to diurnal. Some lemurs are also cathemeral, an activity pattern where an animal is neither strictly diurnal nor nocturnal.

Lemurids are herbivorous, eating fruit, leaves, and, in some cases, nectar. For the most part, they have the dental formula: . A lemur's diet is one that is not restricted since their diet consists of frugivory, granivory, folivory, insectivory, omnivory, and gumnivory foods. Some Subfossil records have contributed to the knowledge of the currently extant lemurs from the Holocene by showing the changes in their dental records in habitats near human activity. This demonstrates that lemur species such as the lemur catta and the common brown lemur were forced to switch their primary diet to a group of secondary food sources.

With most lemurids, the mother gives birth to one or two young after a gestation period of between 120 and 140 days, depending on species. The ruffed lemur species are the only lemurids that have true litters, consisting of anywhere from two to six offspring. They are generally sociable animals, living in groups of up to thirty individuals in some species. In some cases, such as the ring-tailed lemur, the groups are long-lasting, with distinct dominance hierarchies, while in others, such as the common brown lemur, the membership of the groups varies from day to day, and seems to have no clear social structure.

Some of the lemur traits include low basal metabolic rate, highly seasonal breeders, adaptations to unpredictable climate and female dominance. Female dominance amongst lemurs is when the females are sexually monomorphic and have priority access to food. Lemurs live in groups of 11 to 17 animals, where females tend to stay within their natal groups and the males migrate. Male lemurs are competitive to win their mates which causes instability among the other organisms. Lemurs are able to mark their territory by using scents from local areas.

A number of lemur species are considered threatened; two species are critically endangered, one species is endangered, and five species are rated as vulnerable.

Habitat  

The highly seasonal dry deciduous forest of Madagascar alternates between dry and wet seasons, making it uniquely suitable for lemurs. Lemur species diversity increases as the number of tree species in an area increase and is also higher in forests that have been disturbed over undisturbed areas. Evidence from the Subfossil records show that many of the now extinct lemurs actually lived in much drier climates than the currently extant lemurs.

References

External links 

Primate families
Lemurs
Taxa named by John Edward Gray
Taxa described in 1821